Gregory Keith Bright (born August 2, 1957) is a former American football defensive back who played two seasons with the Cincinnati Bengals of the National Football League (NFL). He was drafted by the Bengals in the ninth round of the 1980 NFL Draft. He played college football at Morehead State University and attended Suda E. Butler High School in Louisville, Kentucky.

References

https://www.profootballarchives.com/playerb/brig01400.html

External links
Just Sports Stats

Living people
1957 births
Players of American football from Louisville, Kentucky
American football defensive backs
Morehead State Eagles football players
Cincinnati Bengals players